Hangin' On may refer to:
Hangin' On (album), a 1968 album by Waylon Jennings or its title track
"Hangin' On" (The Gosdin Brothers song), 1967
"Hangin' On" (Chris Young song), 2018

See also
"Hanging On", a 2011 song by Active Child
"Hanging On", a song by Cheyenne Kimball from The Day Has Come